Harmanpreet Kaur (born 8 March 1989) is an Indian cricketer who serves as the captain of the India Women's National Cricket Team in 
all formats . She plays as an all-rounder for the Indian women's cricket team; and was awarded the Arjuna Award for Cricket in the year 2017 by the Ministry of Youth Affairs and Sports.

In November 2018, she became the first woman for India to score a century in a Women's Twenty20 International (WT20I) match. In October 2019, during the series against South Africa, she became the first cricketer for India, male or female, to play in 100 international Twenty20 matches.

Early life 
Kaur was born on 8 March 1989 in Moga, Punjab, to Harmandar Singh Bhullar, a Volleyball and Basketball player and Satwinder Kaur. Her parents are baptised Sikhs. Her younger sister Hemjeet, is post-graduate in English and works as an assistant professor at Guru Nanak College in Moga. Harman used to play with men in the formative days of her career. She moved to Mumbai in 2014 where she began working for the Indian Railways. Harmanpreet was inspired by Virender Sehwag.

Her father, who now is a clerk at a judicial court, was once an aspiring cricketer. He was the first coach of Harman when she had begun playing the sport.

Career
She made her ODI debut at age of 20 against arch-rivals Pakistan women's in March 2009 in the 2009 Women's Cricket World Cup played at Bradman Oval, Bowral. In the match, she bowled 4 overs conceding 10 runs and also caught Armaan Khan off Amita Sharma.

In June 2009, she made her Twenty20 International debut in the 2009 ICC Women's World Twenty20 against England women's at County Ground, Taunton where she scored 8 runs off 7 balls.

Her ability to hit the ball a long way was seen when she played quick-fire innings of 33 against England women's in a T20I game played in Mumbai in 2010.

She was named as Indian women's captain for the 2012 Women's Twenty20 Asia Cup final, as captain Mithali Raj and vice-captain Jhulan Goswami were out because of injuries. She made her debut as captain against Pakistan women's as India defended 81 runs thus won Asia Cup.

In March 2013, she was named ODI captain of India women's when Bangladesh women's toured in India. In the series, Kaur scored her second ODI century in 2nd ODI. Kaur finished the series 195 runs at average of 97.50 with a century and a fifty along with 2 wickets.

In August 2014, she one of the eight debut that played against England women cricket team in a Test match at Sir Paul Getty's Ground, Wormsley in which she scored 9 and a duck in a match.

In November 2014, she took 9 wickets in a Test match South Africa women cricket team played at Gangothri Glades Cricket Ground, Mysore and helped India to win the match by an innings and 34 runs.

In January 2016, she helped India to win series in Australia as well as scored a 31-ball 46 runs in India's highest ever chase in T20 internationals. She continued her form in the 2016 ICC Women's World Twenty20 where she scored 89 runs and took seven wickets in four matches.

In June 2016, she became the first Indian cricketer to be signed by an overseas Twenty20 franchise. Sydney Thunder, the Women's Big Bash League champions, signed her for the 2016–17 season. On 20 July 2017 she scored 171*(115) against Australia in the 2017 Women's Cricket World Cup semi-final in Derby. Kaur's 171* is currently the second-highest score by an Indian batter in women's one-day internationals, behind Deepti Sharma's 188 runs. Kaur also holds the record for the highest individual score for India in Women's cricket World Cup history. Kaur now holds the record for registering the highest ever individual score in a knockout stage of a Women's World Cup match (171*) surpassing the previous record of 107* by Karen Rolton. Kaur was part of the Indian team to reach the final of the 2017 Women's Cricket World Cup where the team lost to England by nine runs. In July 2017, Harman became second India batter to feature in the top-10 of ICC Women's ODI Player Rankings after Mithali Raj.

In December 2017, she was named as one of the players in the ICC Women's T20I Team of the Year.

In October 2018, she was named as the captain of India's squad for the 2018 ICC Women's World Twenty20 tournament in the West Indies. Ahead of the tournament, she was named as one of the players to watch. In the opening match of the tournament, against New Zealand, she became the first woman for India to score a century in WT20Is, when she made 103 runs from 51 balls. She was the leading run-scorer for India in the tournament, with 183 runs in five matches.

In November 2018, she was named in Sydney Thunder's squad for the 2018–19 Women's Big Bash League season. In January 2020, she was named as the captain of India's squad for the 2020 ICC Women's T20 World Cup in Australia. In 2021, she was drafted by Manchester Originals for the inaugural season of The Hundred. She played for them in 3 games, scoring 104 runs before withdrawing herself from the tournament due to injury.

In March 2021 against South Africa, she became fifth Indian woman cricketer to represent the country in 100 ODIs. In May 2021, she was named as the vice-captain of India's Test squad for their one-off match against the England women's cricket team. In September 2021, she was signed by Melbourne Renegades for 2021–22 Women's Big Bash League season.

In January 2022, she was named in India's team for the 2022 Women's Cricket World Cup in New Zealand. In July 2022, she was named as the captain of India's team for the cricket tournament at the 2022 Commonwealth Games in Birmingham, England.

In February 2023, in the inaugural WPL auction, she was bought by Mumbai Indians for ₹1.80 crores.

References

Further reading

External links

 
 

1989 births
Living people
Indian women cricketers
India women One Day International cricketers
India women Twenty20 International cricketers
India women Test cricketers
Indian women cricket captains
People from Moga, Punjab
Punjabi people
Punjab, India women cricketers
Sydney Thunder (WBBL) cricketers
Lancashire Thunder cricketers
IPL Supernovas cricketers
Recipients of the Arjuna Award
Manchester Originals cricketers
Melbourne Renegades (WBBL) cricketers
Mumbai Indians (WPL) cricketers
Cricketers at the 2022 Commonwealth Games
Commonwealth Games silver medallists for India
Commonwealth Games medallists in cricket
Medallists at the 2022 Commonwealth Games